Universal Soldier is a series of science fiction action films. The franchise began in 1992 with Universal Soldier and as of 2012 comprises six entries. The films centered on the character of Luc Deveraux (played first by Jean-Claude Van Damme and then by Matt Battaglia) until Universal Soldier: Day of Reckoning, which focuses on a new protagonist named John (played by Scott Adkins).

Film and television critic Matt Zoller Seitz stated that the Universal Soldier franchise "is a rare series that takes more creative risks as it goes along".

Films

Universal Soldier (1992)

Directed by Roland Emmerich and written by Richard Rothstein, Christopher Leitch, and Dean Devlin, it stars Jean-Claude Van Damme, Dolph Lundgren, and Ally Walker.

In the first installment of the franchise, American soldier Luc Deveraux (Van Damme) finds that his superior officer, Andrew Scott (Lundgren), has turned violently deranged, and the two fight to the death during the Vietnam War. After their bodies are retrieved, they are placed into a secret program in which they are reanimated as superhuman agents and trained to become unquestioning killing machines. While Devereaux and Scott initially have no memory of their former lives, glimpses of their pasts start to return, rekindling their intense conflict.

Universal Soldier II: Brothers in Arms (1998)

After the original film was released, Carolco, the production company that backed the film, went bankrupt and sold the rights of the series to Skyvision Entertainment, located in Toronto, in 1995. As a result, two TV films were released direct-to-video starring Matt Battaglia as Luc Deveraux and Chandra West as Veronica Roberts in Universal Soldier II: Brothers in Arms and Universal Soldier III: Unfinished Business. The films were produced for Showtime / The Movie Channel as a miniseries meant as a backdoor pilot for a series.

Directed by Jeff Woolnough and written by Peter M. Lenkov, the film stars Matt Battaglia, Chandra West, and Gary Busey.

This direct-to-video sequel takes place exactly after the events of the original Universal Soldier. Following the events of the original Universal Soldier testing, the budget has been slashed by the government; however, under the orders of a CIA director, a gang of mercenaries take control of the new line of Universal Soldiers and try to use them into helping to smuggle diamonds to the highest foreign buyer. Meanwhile, Luc Deveraux (Matt Battaglia) and Veronica Roberts (Chandra West) are in hiding on his parents’ farm. The UniSol controllers then activate a homing beacon embedded inside Deveraux's body that makes him return to the UniSol base in Chicago where his memory is reprogrammed. Veronica follows and while sneaking into the UniSol lab to rescue Luc, she discovers that his older brother Eric, a deceased soldier from Vietnam, has also been resurrected.

Universal Soldier III: Unfinished Business (1998)

Once again, directed by Jeff Woolnough and written by Peter M. Lenkov, the film stars Matt Battaglia, Chandra West, Jeff Wincott, and Burt Reynolds.

Luc Devereaux (Battaglia) and Veronica Roberts (Chandra West) continue their attempts to expose the Universal Soldier unit. After a hostage situation mistakenly leaves Veronica a fugitive, the two escape the city and go into hiding. Meanwhile, CIA Deputy Director Mentor (Burt Reynolds) and Dr. Walker are in the process of creating a powerful UniSol clone of Luc's brother, Eric (Jeff Wincott), to assassinate him and Veronica.

Universal Soldier: The Return (1999)

Directed by Mic Rodgers and written by William Malone and John Fasano, starring Jean-Claude Van Damme, Michael Jai White, and Bill Goldberg.

In this theatrical sequel to the original film (while ignoring the previous two television films), Luc Deveraux (Van Damme) had been reverted to human state and has a 13-year-old daughter called Hillary. He works with scientist Dylan Cotner to create a new, safer breed of fighters that are connected through an artificially intelligent computer system called S.E.T.H. (Self-Evolving Thought Helix). The project loses funding, and the supercomputer is scheduled to be turned off. To preserve itself S.E.T.H. takes over a superior UniSol model (White) and kidnaps Hillary. Deveraux must save his daughter and prevent the machine from destroying mankind.

Universal Soldier: Regeneration (2009)

Directed by John Hyams and written by Victor Ostrovsky, starring Jean-Claude Van Damme, Dolph Lundgren, and Andrei "The Pit Bull" Arlovski.

In this revival of the franchise, Regeneration disregards the events of The Return as well as its made-for-cable predecessors by beginning the film with Former UniSol Luc Deveraux (Van Damme) undergoing rehabilitation therapy in Switzerland under Dr. Sandra Fleming with the goal of rejoining society. However, when a terrorist sect uses an experimental Next Generation UniSol (NGU) to seize the atomic reactor at Chernobyl, Deveraux is reactivated to save the country from a nuclear catastrophe. Deveraux also has to contend with his nemesis, "Andrew" (Dolph Lundgren), the clone of his former Universal Soldier colleague who's been employed by the terrorists.

Universal Soldier: Day of Reckoning (2012)

Directed by John Hyams, written by John Hyams, Doug Magnuson, and Jon Greenlagh, it stars Jean-Claude Van Damme, Dolph Lundgren, Andrei "The Pit Bull" Arlovski, and Scott Adkins.

In the film, Luc Devereaux, who went rogue, has created a terrifying army of cloned UniSols determined to infiltrate the government which they hold responsible for their pain.
A special agent called John, willing to avenge his murdered family, is pitted against Deveraux and a new clone of Andrew Scott.

Future 
Todd Black and Jason Blumenthal hired Richard Wenk to write the reboot in October 2018. The story will focus on one resurrected soldier.

Television
In October 2011, writer Damien Kindler was set to write a Universal Soldier TV series for Fremantle Media North America with producers from the original film Allen Shapiro and Craig Baumgarten attached to the project.

Cast and crew

Principal cast

Additional crew

Storyline continuity

Universal Soldier: Regeneration revived the franchise in 2009 by disregarding the events of The Return, as well as its made-for-cable predecessors. A Collider article that focuses on Days of Reckoning and interviews the film's director states that the latest installment in the franchise is "either the third, fourth or sixth film in the franchise depending on if you include the pair of non-canon direct-to-television sequels and/or the totally retconned Universal Soldier: The Return"; despite it, minor elements from these films can be found within the canon series including UniSol clones and UniSol sleeper-agents (from II and III).

Production

Development
The Universal Soldier franchise began in 1992 with Universal Soldier, starring Jean-Claude Van Damme and Dolph Lundgren. The series centers on two American soldiers, Luc Deveraux (Van Damme) and Andrew Scott (Lundgren), who are killed during the Vietnam War and reanimated in the 1990s as highly advanced Universal Soldiers.

After Universal Soldier was released, Carolco, the production company that backed the film, went bankrupt and sold the rights of the series to Skyvision Entertainment, located in Toronto, in 1995. As a result, two TV films were released as television films starring Matt Battaglia as Luc Deveraux and Chandra West as Veronica Roberts in Universal Soldier II: Brothers in Arms and Universal Soldier III: Unfinished Business. The films were produced for Showtime / The Movie Channel as a miniseries meant as a backdoor pilot for a series.

In 1999, Van Damme returned for the fourth installment, Universal Soldier: The Return. An overwhelming critical and financial failure, The Return contradicted several elements of the previous film's plot by making Luc Deveraux no longer a Universal Soldier, giving him a daughter, and removing female protagonist Veronica Roberts.

The subsequent film in the series, Universal Soldier: Regeneration, revived the franchise in 2009, disregarding the events of The Return, as well as its made-for-cable predecessors. Universal Soldier: Day of Reckoning featured Van Damme and Lundgren in much smaller roles, and introduced a new protagonist named John (Scott Adkins) fighting against both Deveraux and Scott.

Reception

Box office performance

Critical and public response

Other media

Comic book
In 1992, a short-lived comic book tie-in was released by Now Comics.

Video games
A video game based on the film, also titled Universal Soldier, was developed by The Code Monkeys and published by Accolade in 1992. The game was a conversion of Turrican II: The Final Fight for the Sega Genesis and Game Boy. Another version was developed later for the SNES, but was never released.

See also

 Universal Soldiers, an unrelated film distributed by The Asylum

References

Action film series
TriStar Pictures franchises
Sony Pictures franchises
Universal Soldier (film series)
Film series introduced in 1992